Rob Kling (August 1944 – 15 May 2003) was a North American professor of Information Systems and Information science at the School of Library and Information Science (SLIS) and Adjunct Professor of Computer Science, Indiana University, United States. He directed the interdisciplinary Center for Social Informatics (CSI), at Indiana University. He is considered to have been a key founder of social analyses of computing and a leading expert on the study of social informatics.

Bibliography (2000 to 2004)
 Hara, N., & Kling, R. (2000). Students’ distress with a web-based distance education course. Information, Communication & Society, 3(4), 557-579.
 Kling, R. (2000). Information technologies and the strategic reconfiguration of libraries in communication networks (No. WP-00-04). Bloomington, IN: Center for Social Informatics.
 Kling, R. (2000). Learning about information technologies and social change: The contribution of social informatics. The Information Society, 16(3), 217-232.
 Kling, R. (2000). Letter from the editor-in-chief. The Information Society, 16(1), 1-3.
 Kling, R. (2000). Letter from the editor-in-chief. The Information Society, 16(3), 167-168.
 Kling, R. (2000). Social informatics: A new perspective on social research about information and communication technologies. Prometheus, 18(3), 245-264.
 Kling, R., & Hara, N. (2000). Students’ distress with a web-based distance education course: An ethnographic study of participants’ experiences (No. WP 00-01-B1). Bloomington, IN: Center for Social Informatics.
 Kling, R., & McKim, G. (2000). Not just a matter of time: Field differences and the shaping of electronic media in supporting scientific communication. Journal of the American Society for Information Science, 51(14), 1306-1320.
 King, A. B., & Kling, R. (2001). Valuing technology: Organizations, culture, and change. American Journal of Sociology, 107(2), 533-535.
 Kling, R. (2001). The internet and the strategic reconfiguration of libraries. Library Administration and Management, 15(3), 16-23.
 Kling, R., & Callahan, E. (2001). Electronic journals, the internet, and scholarly communication (No. WP- 01-04). Bloomington, IN: Center for Social Informatics.
 Kling, R., Fortuna, J., & King, A. (2001). The remarkable transformation of E-Biomed into PubMed central (No. WP- 01-03). Bloomington, IN: Center for Social Informatics.
 Kling, R., Kraemer, K. L., Allen, J. P., Bakos, Y., Gurbaxani, V., & Elliott, M. (2001). Transforming coordination: The promise and problems of information technology in coordination. In T. Malone, G. Olson & J. Smith (Eds.), Coordination theory and collaboration technology. Mahwah, NJ: Lawrence Erlbaum.
 Kling, R., & Iacono, S. (2001). Computerization movements: The rise of the internet and distant forms of work. In J. Yates & J. V. Maanan (Eds.), Information technology and organizational transformation: History, rhetoric, and practice (pp. 93–136). Thousand Oakes, CA: Sage Publications.
 Kling, R., McKim, G., & King, A. (2001). A bit more to it: Scholarly communication forums as socio-technical interaction networks (No. WP-01-02). Bloomington, IN: Center for Social Informatics.
 Hara, N. & Kling, R. (2002). Communities of practice with and without information technology. In E.M. Rasmussen, & E. Toms, American Society of Information Science and Technology 2002: Information, connections and community (Philadelphia, PA; November 18–21, 2002), 39, 338-349. Medford, NJ: Information Today, Inc.
 Kling, R. (2002). Critical professional discourses about information and communications technologies and social life in the U.S. In K. Brunnstein & J. Berleur (Eds.), Human choice and computers: Issues of choice and quality of life in the information society: International Federation for Information Processing 17th world computer conference (Montreal, Quebec; August 25–30, 2002), 1-20. Boston: Kluwer Academic Publishers.
 Kling, R. (2002). Critical professional education about information and communications technologies and social life (No. WP-02-06). Bloomington, IN: Center for Social Informatics.
 Kling, R. (2002). The internet galaxy: Reflections on the internet, business, and society. Academe-Bulletin of the American Association of University Professors, 88(4), 66-68.
 Kling, R. (2002). Untitled. The Information Society, 18(1), I-II.
 Kling, R. (2002). Untitled. The Information Society, 18(3), 147-149.
 Kling, R., & Courtright, C. (2002). Group behavior and learning in electronic forums: A socio-technical approach (No. WP- 02-09). Bloomington, IN: Center for Social Informatics.
 Kling, R., & Hara, N. (2002). Informatics and distributed learning (No. WP- 02-05). Bloomington, IN: Center for Social Informatics.
 Kling, R., & Hara, N. (2002). IT supports for communities of practice: An empirically-based framework (No. WP- 02-02). Bloomington, IN: Center for Social Informatics.
 Kling, R., & Lamb, R. (2002). From users to social actors: Reconceptualizing socially rich interaction through information and communication technology (No. WP- 02-11). Bloomington, IN: Center for Social Informatics.
 Kling, R., & Meyer, E. T. (2002). Leveling the playing field, or expanding the bleachers? Socio-technical interaction networks and arXiv.org (No. WP- 02-10). Bloomington, IN: Center for Social Informatics.
 Kling, R., & Spector, L. (2002). Academic rewards for scholarly research communication via electronic publishing (No. WP- 02-13). Bloomington, IN: Center for Social Informatics.
 Kling, R., Spector, L., & McKim, G. (2002). Locally controlled scholarly publishing via the internet: The guild model. In E.M. Rasmussen, & E. Toms, American Society of Information Science and Technology 2002: Information, connections and community (Philadelphia, PA; November 18–21, 2002). Medford, NJ: Information Today, Inc.
 Kling, R., Spector, L., & McKim, G. (2002). Locally controlled scholarly publishing via the internet: The guild model (No. WP- 02-01). Bloomington, IN: Center for Social Informatics.
 Kling, R., Spector, L., & McKim, G. (2002). Locally controlled scholarly publishing via the internet: The guild model. Journal of Electronic Publishing, 8(1).
 Kling, R., & Swygard-Hobaugh, A. J. (2002). The internet and the velocity of scholarly journal publishing (No. WP- 02-12). Bloomington, IN: Center for Social Informatics.
 Kling, R. (2003). Critical professional education about information and communications technologies and social life. Information Technology & People, 16(4), 394-418.
 Kling, R. (2003). The internet and unrefereed scholarly publishing (No. WP- 03-01). Bloomington, IN: Center for Social Informatics.
 Kling, R. (2003). Power issues in knowledge management (No. WP- 03-02). Bloomington, IN: Center for Social Informatics.
 Kling, R. (2003). Social informatics. In A. Kent, H. Lancour, W. Z. Nasri & J. E. Daily (Eds.), Encyclopedia of library and information science. New York: Marcel Dekker, Inc.
 Kling, R., & Callahan, E. (2003). Electronic journals, the internet, and scholarly communication. In B. Cronin & D. Shaw (Eds.), Annual review of information science and technology, 37, 127-177. Medford, NJ: InformationToday, Inc.
 Kling, R., & Courtright, C. (2003). Group behavior and learning in electronic forums: A Socio-technical approach. In S. Barab & R. Kling (Eds.), Designing for virtual communities in the service of learning. Cambridge, MA: Cambridge University Press.
 Kling, R., & Courtright, C. (2003). Group behavior and learning in electronic forums: A sociotechnical approach. The Information Society, 19(3), 221-235.
 Kling, R., & Kraemer, K. L. (2003). Letter from the Editor-in-Chief [Special issue: Globalization of electronic commerce]. The Information Society, 19(1), 1-3.
 Kling, R., McKim, G., & King, A. (2003). A bit more to it: Scholarly communication forums as socio-technical interaction networks. Journal of the American Society for Information Science and Technology, 54(1), 47-67.
 Lamb, R., King, J. L., & Kling, R. (2003). Informational environments: Organizational contexts of online information use. Journal of the American Society for Information Science and Technology, 54(2), 97-114.
 Lamb, R., & Kling, R. (2003). Reconceptualizing users as social actors in information systems research. MIS Quarterly, 27(2), 197-235.
 Barab, S., Kling, R., & Gray, J. (2004). Building online communities in the service of learning. Cambridge, MA: Cambridge University Press.
 Kling, R., Spector, L. B., & Fortuna, J. (2004). The real stakes of virtual publishing: The transformation of E-Biomed into PubMed central. Journal of the American Society for Information Science and Technology, 55(2), 127-148.

References 

1944 births
2003 deaths
American information theorists
Information systems researchers
Columbia University alumni